Stacy Spikes (born February 10, 1968 ) is an American entrepreneur and former film marketing executive and producer. He is best known as the founding CEO of MoviePass, a subscription-based service for going to the movies in the United States, and founder of the Urbanworld Film Festival. Spikes has held senior executive roles at  Motown Records, Sony Music Entertainment, Miramax Films, and October Films.

Life 
Spikes is from Houston, Texas. In 1985, he relocated to Los Angeles to follow his desire to work in the entertainment industry.

Career 
Spikes' career began in 1986 at Motown Records, where he was the product manager for Boyz II Men, Stevie Wonder, Spike Lee, Queen Latifah, and Eddie Murphy. In 1990, Spikes joined Sony Music Entertainment and worked on feature film soundtracks for movies including Jungle Fever, Bad Boys, House Party, House Party 2, Prêt-à-Porter, and Darnell Martin's I Like It Like That. In 1994, Spikes became vice president of marketing at Miramax Films. At Miramax, Spikes led marketing campaigns for films including Trainspotting, The Crow: City of Angels, Don’t Be a Menace, Emma and Scream. From 1996–97, Spikes was senior vice president of marketing at October Films.

Spikes founded the Urbanworld Film Festival in 1997. The festival is held annually in New York City.

Spikes launched MoviePass in February 2011 along with co-founder Hamet Watt. In October 2012, the company introduced a new evolution of their business model that uses proprietary location-based payment technology, and provides a secure and independent way for MoviePass members to purchase tickets. He was fired from the company in January 2018 after it was acquired by Helios and Matheson Analytics. In 2021, Spikes bought the company back out of bankruptcy; he relaunched it in Fall 2022.

Filmography 

Spikes was the executive producer for Punks, The Visit, King of the Jungle, Higher Ed (2001), For da Love of Money (2002), and the TV movie Urbanworld Film Festival Special (2004).

Honors 

Spikes was named one of the "25 Most Influential African-Americans In Technology" and as part of "THE SILICON ALLEY 100: The Coolest People In New York Tech This Year" in 2012 by Business Insider. Crain's New York named Spikes as one of the "People to watch in Silicon Alley."

He also received a “Made in NY Award” from Mayor Bloomberg in 2011 for his work with the Urbanworld Film Festival.

References

External links 
 
 

Living people
African-American business executives
American business executives
African-American film producers
American film producers
African-American company founders
American company founders
People from Texas
1968 births
21st-century African-American people
20th-century African-American people